Archernis is a genus of moths of the family Crambidae.

Species
Archernis albicostalis Hampson, 1913
Archernis argocephala Lower, 1903
Archernis callixantha Meyrick, 1886
Archernis capitalis (Fabricius, 1794)
Archernis dolopsalis (Walker, 1859)
Archernis eucosma Turner, 1908
Archernis flavidalis Hampson, 1908
Archernis fulvalis Hampson, 1913
Archernis fulvalis Hampson, 1899
Archernis humilis (Swinhoe, 1894)
Archernis leucocosma Turner, 1908
Archernis lugens (Warren, 1896)
Archernis mitis Turner, 1937
Archernis nictitans (Swinhoe, 1894)
Archernis obliquialis Hampson, 1896
Archernis scopulalis (Walker, 1865)

References

Spilomelinae
Crambidae genera
Taxa named by Edward Meyrick